Paintings in My Mind is the second full-length studio release (third, if the "Republic of Idols" EP is counted) from pianist and singer-songwriter Tommy Page. Released in 1990, it features 10 tracks, all of which Page either wrote by himself or co-wrote.  The single "I'll Be Your Everything" was co-written by Page, Jordan Knight, and Danny Wood; it became a smash hit in 1990, peaking at number one on the Billboard Hot 100.  Another New Kids on the Block alumnus, Donnie Wahlberg, contributed to the writing of the song "Turn on the Radio" (the second single).  The album also features a duet with singer Sa-Fire on the song "Don't Give Up on Love."

Track listing
 "I'll Be Your Everything" (Tommy Page, Jordan Knight, Danny Wood) 4:08
 "I Break Down" (Page) 3:46
 "Turn on the Radio" (Page, Knight, Donnie Wahlberg) 4:03
 "Don't Give Up on Love (duet with Sa-Fire)" (Page, Wilma Cosmé, L. Russell Brown) 3:54
 "When I Dream of You" (Page) 4:07
 "Till the End of Time" (Page, Brown) 5:09
 "Just Before (I Was Gonna Say I Love You)" (Page) 3:44
 "Don't Walk Away" (Page, Brown) 3:34
 "You're the Best Thing (That Ever Happened to Me)" (Page) 4:05
 "Paintings in My Mind" (Page) 4:05

Personnel
Tommy Page - vocals
Angela & Rachele Cappelli, Lani Groves, Carrie Johnson, Libby Johnson, Peter Lord, V. Jeffrey Smith, Sandra St. Victor, Danny Wood - backing vocals
Ira Siegel, John McCurry, Bobby Keyes, Kevin Clark - guitars
Jordan Knight, Eric Kupper, Art Labriola, Jeremy Lubbock, Randy Waldman, Fred Zarr - keyboards
Maurice Starr - bass
Donnie Wahlberg - drums
Bashiri Johnson - percussion
Dave Lebolt, Joe Mardin - keyboard & drum programming
Bob Gay, Walter Platt, Andy Snitzer - horns, arranged by Michael Jonzun
Strings arranged by Miguel Pessoa

Reception
In his AllMusic review, Peter Fawthrop called the album a fresh, innocent album full of youthful longing and said that it was top fare for the teen pop crowd.

Release history

References

1990 albums
Sire Records albums
Albums produced by Michael Jonzun
Albums produced by Arif Mardin